Köln-Worringen is a railway station on the Lower Left Rhine Railway, situated in Cologne in western Germany. It is served by the S11 line of the Rhine-Ruhr S-Bahn at 20-minute intervals from Monday to Friday and at 30-minute intervals on the weekend.

References 

Railway stations in Cologne
S11 (Rhine-Ruhr S-Bahn)
Rhine-Ruhr S-Bahn stations
Railway stations in Germany opened in 1855
1855 establishments in Prussia
Chorweiler